Thomas Brenan Femister Gargett (1898–1975) was an architect in Brisbane, Queensland, Australia. Many of his buildings have been heritage-listed. He is one of the original founders of Conrad Gargett, a long-running architectural practice in Brisbane.

Notable works 

His heritage-listed works include:

1925: Cracknell Road Congregational Church (now Brisbane Fijian Uniting Church), Annerley
1933: former South Brisbane Congregational Church (now Saint Nicholas Free Serbian Orthodox Church), South Brisbane
1935: Harker Memorial Library at Somerville House
1958-59: St Michael and All Angels Church, New Farm

References 

Architects from Brisbane
1898 births
1975 deaths